Novouspenivka is a village in the Melitopol Raion of Zaporizhzhia Oblast, in Ukraine.

Geography
The T0811 highway passes through the village.

History
Later it was renamed Suknovalivka (. In 1961, it received the modern name Novouspenivka.

As of 1886, 958 people lived in the village and there were 135 households.

According to the data of the State Archive of the Zaporizhzhia Region, and the testimony of eyewitnesses, 42 of the village's residents died during the Holodomor.

In 1962-1965, it belonged to the Mykhailivka Raion of the Zaporizhzhia Oblast, then it became part of the Vesele Raion.

Demographics
According to the 1989 Soviet Census, the population of the village was 1,172, of which 534 were men and 638 were women.

According to the 2001 Ukrainian Census, 995 people lived in the village, and the distribution of the population by native language was:

References

1861 establishments in the Russian Empire
Populated places established in 1861
Villages in Melitopol Raion